The 2022–23 De Graafschap season is the club's 69th season in existence and the club's fourth consecutive season in the top flight of Dutch football. In addition to the domestic league, De Graafschap will participate in this season's edition of the KNVB Cup. The season covers the period from 1 July 2022 to 30 June 2023.

Players

Current squad

Out on loan

Pre-season and friendlies

Competitions

Overall record

Eerste Divisie

League table

Results summary

Results by round

Matches 
The league fixtures were announced on 17 June 2022.

KNVB Cup

References

De Graafschap
De Graafschap